Pierrepont School is the name of several educational institutions.

United Kingdom
Pierrepont School, Frensham

United States
Pierrepont School (Westport, CT)
Pierrepont School (Rutherford, NJ)